The 2013–14 South West Peninsula League season was the seventh in the history of the South West Peninsula League, a football competition in England, that feeds the Premier Division of the Western Football League. The league had been formed in 2007 from the merger of the Devon County League and the South Western League, and is restricted to clubs based in Cornwall and Devon. The Premier Division of the South West Peninsula League is on the same level of the National League System as the Western League Division One.

Premier Division

The Premier Division featured 20 teams, the same as the previous season, after Dartmouth resigned, Liverton United took voluntary demotion to Division One East, and Penzance were relegated to Division One West. Three new clubs joined the league:

Elmore, transferred from the Western League Division One.
Exmouth Town, promoted as champions of Division One East.
Godolphin Atlantic, promoted as champions of Division One West.

Exmouth Town were the only club to apply for promotion to Step 5, but they failed ground grading.

League table

Division One East

Division One East featured 16 clubs, the same as the previous season, after Exmouth Town were promoted to the Premier Division, and one new club joined:
Liverton United, taking voluntary demotion from the Premier Division.
Exeter Civil Service changed their name to Exwick Villa.

Only Galmpton United and Stoke Gabriel applied for promotion to the Premier Division, pending ground inspections. Galmpton failed, and Stoke Gabriel passed.

Division One West

Division One West featured 16 clubs, the same as the previous season, after Godolphin Atlantic were promoted to the Premier Division and Hayle resigned before the season started, taking their reserves' place in the Cornwall Combination. Two new clubs joined:

Bude Town, promoted as champions of the East Cornwall League.
Penzance, relegated from the Premier Division.

Despite a record start to the campaign, Mousehole would not accept promotion to the Premier Division this season, even if they won the championship. Only Callington Town, Helston Athletic, Truro City Reserves and Wadebridge Town applied for promotion to the Premier Division, pending ground inspections. All four clubs passed.

References

External links
 South West Peninsula League

South West Peninsula League
10